Bank of Newark Building is a historic bank building located at Newark in New Castle County, Delaware.  It was built about 1845 and is a three-story, gable-roofed brick building with a symmetrical five-bay facade and a three-story ell to the rear. It is in a restrained form of the Greek Revival style. The front facade features a portico and massive pilasters added sometime after 1929.

In 2010, a second location of the popular Wilmington, DE restaurant Catherine Rooney's moved into the original section of this building.

It was added to the National Register of Historic Places in 1983.

References

Bank buildings on the National Register of Historic Places in Delaware
Commercial buildings completed in 1845
Buildings and structures in Newark, Delaware
National Register of Historic Places in New Castle County, Delaware